The Organisation to Build a United Togo (OBUTS) is a political party in Togo.

History
OBUTS was established  by former Prime Minister Agbéyomé Kodjo in 2008. and Kodjo was its candidate for the 2010 presidential elections; he finished fourth in a field of seven candidates with less than 1% of the vote. The party joined the Save Togo Collective alliance prior to the 2013 parliamentary elections, with the alliance winning 19 of the 91 seats.

References

External links
Official website

Political parties in Togo
Political parties established in 2008
2008 establishments in Togo